The canton of Pont-Hébert is an administrative division of the Manche department, northwestern France. It was created at the French canton reorganisation which came into effect in March 2015. Its seat is in Pont-Hébert.

It consists of the following communes:

Airel
Amigny
Bérigny
Carentan-les-Marais (partly)
Cavigny
Cerisy-la-Forêt
Couvains
Le Dézert
Graignes-Mesnil-Angot
La Meauffe
Le Mesnil-Rouxelin
Le Mesnil-Véneron
Moon-sur-Elle
Pont-Hébert
Rampan
Saint-André-de-l'Épine
Saint-Clair-sur-l'Elle
Saint-Fromond
Saint-Georges-d'Elle
Saint-Georges-Montcocq
Saint-Germain-d'Elle
Saint-Jean-de-Daye
Saint-Jean-de-Savigny
Saint-Pierre-de-Semilly
Tribehou
Villiers-Fossard

References

Cantons of Manche